The following is an alphabetical list of articles related to the U.S. state of Hawaii:

0–9 

 .hi.us – Internet second-level domain for the state of Hawaii
 25th Infantry Division
 29th Hawaii State Legislature
 50th state to join the United States of America
 100th Infantry Battalion, 442nd Regimental Combat Team
 154th Wing
 1840 Constitution of the Kingdom of Hawaii
 1852 Constitution of the Kingdom of Hawaii
 1864 Constitution of the Kingdom of Hawaii
 1868 Hawaii earthquake
 1887 Constitution of the Kingdom of Hawaii
 1892 Legislative Session of the Kingdom of Hawaii
 1895 Wilcox rebellion
 1955 Hawaiian submarine eruption
 1975 Hawaii earthquake
 1978 Hawaii State Constitutional Convention
 1999 Hawaii Rainbow Warriors football team
 2004 Hawaii Bowl
 2006 Kiholo Bay earthquake
 2012 Hawaii hailstorm
 2012 Hawaiian Islands Invitational
 2018 Hawaii false missile alert

Okina
 Āhihi-Kīnau Natural Area Reserve
 Ahu ula
 Āhualoa
 Āhuimanu
 Aiea, Hawaii
 Aiea High School
 Āina Haina
 Āinahau
 Āinaloa
 Āinapō Trail
 Akaka Falls State Park
 Akoni Pule Highway
 Eleele
 Ewa Beach, Hawaii
 Ewa District, Hawaii
 Ewa Gentry, Hawaii
 Ewa Villages, Hawaii
 Īao Theater
 Īao Valley
 Imiloa Astronomy Center
 Imiola Church
 Iolani Barracks
 Iolani Luahine Hula Festival
 Iolani Palace
 Iolani School
 Ōōkala, Hawaii
 Okina
 Olu Pua Botanical Garden and Plantation
 Ōmao
 Ōpaekaa Falls
 Ōpaekaa Road Bridge
 Ualapue, Hawaii
 Ūkēkē
 Upolu Point

A
 A.J. Williamson House
 A. Nanbu Hotel-Holy's Bakery
 Abbott Seamount
 ABC Stores (Hawaii)
 Abortion in Hawaii
 AES Hawaii Power Plant
 Africans in Hawaii
Agriculture in Hawaii
commons:Category:Agriculture in Hawaii
 Āhole Hōlua Complex
 Ahu A Umi Heiau
 Ahukini Terminal and Railway Company
 Ahupuaa
 Ahupuaa O Kahana State Park
 Ainahou Ranch (āina hou)
 Aikāne
 Air Force–Hawaii football rivalry
 Air Force Maui Optical and Supercomputing observatory
 Air Hawaii
 Akaka Bill, Native Hawaiian Government Reorganization Act of 2009 (S1011/HR2314)
 Akupu, Hawaii
 Ala Kahakai National Historic Trail
 Ala Moana
 Ala Moana Beach Park
 Ala Moana Center
 Alaea salt (alaea)
 Alakai Wilderness Preserve
 Albert Spencer Wilcox Beach House
 Albert Spencer Wilcox Building
 Alexander & Baldwin Sugar Museum
 Alexander Young Building
 Alfred Hocking House
 Alii
 Alii nui of Hawaii
 Allerton Garden
 Aloha
 Aloha Āina
 Aloha Air Cargo
 Aloha Airlines
 Aloha Bowl
 Aloha Festivals
 Aloha Jewish Chapel
 Aloha Petroleum
 Aloha Stadium
 Aloha Tower
 ALOHAnet
 Aloha shirt
 Amfac, Inc.
 Amphibious caterpillar
 Amusement parks in Hawaii
commons:Category:Amusement parks in Hawaii
 Anahola, Hawaii
 Anahulu River
 Ancient Hawaii
 Ancient Hawaiian aquaculture
 Ancient Hawaiian population
 Anna Ranch Heritage Center
 Apology Resolution
 Apostolic Vicar of the Hawaiian Islands
 Aqua Hotels and Resorts
 Aquaria in Hawaii
commons:Category:Aquaria in Hawaii
 Arboreta in Hawaii
commons:Category:Arboreta in Hawaii
 Archaeology of Hawaii
:Category:Archaeological sites in Hawaii
commons:Category:Archaeological sites in Hawaii
 Archeological Sites at Kawela
 Archipelago
 Architecture of Hawaii
 Area code 808
 Area codes in Hawaii
 Arizona Memorial
 Art museums and galleries in Hawaii
commons:Category:Art museums and galleries in Hawaii
 Asian immigration to Hawaii
 Assets School
 Associated Students of the University of Hawaii
 Astronomical observatories in Hawaii
commons:Category:Astronomical observatories in Hawaii
 Attorney General of Hawaii
 Aulani (aulani)
 Aviation in Hawaii

B
 Bailey House Museum
 Bamboo Ridge
 Bank of Hawaii
 Banzai Pipeline
 Barbers Point Light (Hawaii)
 Battle of Kealakekua Bay
 Battle of Kepaniwai
 Battle of Mokuohai
 Battle of Nuuanu
 Beaches of Hawaii
 commons:Category:Beaches of Hawaii
 Bellows Air Force Station
 Bible translations into Hawaii Pidgin
 Big Five (Hawaii)
 Big Island Film Festival
 Big Island Interscholastic Federation
 Big Island National Wildlife Refuge Complex
 Billings Volcanos (basketball)
 Birds of Hawaii
 Bishop Museum
 Bishop National Bank of Hawaii
 Black Week (Hawaii)
 Blue Hawaii (drink)
 Blue Note Hawaii
 Botanical gardens in Hawaii
 commons:Category:Botanical gardens in Hawaii
 Bobcat Trail Habitation Cave
 Boettcher Estate
 Bond District
 Brick Palace
 Brigham Young University–Hawaii
 Buildings and structures in Hawaii
 commons:Category: Buildings and structures in Hawaii
 TheBus (Honolulu)
 Byodo-In Temple
 BYU–Hawaii Seasiders
 BYU–Hawaii Seasiders men's basketball

C
 Caltech Submillimeter Observatory
 Cathedral Basilica of Our Lady of Peace
 Cathedral Church of Saint Andrew (Honolulu)
 Cannabis in Hawaii
 Canada–France–Hawaii Telescope

Canyons and gorges of Hawaii
commons:Category:Canyons and gorges of Hawaii
 Cape Kumukahi Light
 Capital of the State of Hawaii
 Capitol of the State of Hawaii
commons:Category:Hawaii State Capitol
 Captain Cook, Hawaii
 Captain Vancouver Landing Site on Maui
 Casual Friday
 Catholic missions in Hawaii
 Caves of Hawaii
commons:Category:Caves of Hawaii
 Ceded lands
 Census statistical areas in Hawaii
 Central Baptist Church (Honolulu, Hawaii)
 Central Middle School (Honolulu, Hawaii)
 Central Pacific Hurricane Center
 Chain of Craters Road
 Channels of the Hawaiian Islands
 Charles Montague Cooke Jr. House and Kūkaōō Heiau
 Chinatown, Honolulu
 Chinese immigration to Hawaii
 Christmas in Hawaii
 Church of Hawaii
 The Church of Jesus Christ of Latter-day Saints in Hawaii
 Church of the Crossroads
 Climate of Hawaii
 Climate change in Hawaii
 Coco Palms Resort
 Coconut
 Coconut Island (Hawaii Island)
 Coffee production in Hawaii
 Coins of the Hawaiian dollar
 Colahan Seamount
 Committee of Safety (Hawaii)
 Communications in Hawaii
commons:Category:Communications in Hawaii
 Communist Party of Hawaii
 The Company (Hawaiian organized crime)
 Congressional Delegations from Hawaii
 Constitution of Hawaii
 Co-Cathedral of Saint Theresa of the Child Jesus (Honolulu, Hawaii)
 Committee of Safety (Hawaii)
 Cook Landing Site
 Council for Native Hawaiian Advancement
 Courts of Hawaii

 Convention centers in Hawaii
commons:Category:Convention centers in Hawaii
 Counties of the State of Hawaii
commons:Category:Counties in Hawaii
 Crestview, Hawaii
 Crime in Hawaii
 Cuisine of Hawaii
 Culture of Hawaii
 Culture of the Native Hawaiians
Customs and etiquette in Hawaii
:Category:Hawaii culture
commons:Category:Hawaii culture

D
 Daifukuji Soto Zen Mission
 Daikakuji Guyot
 Damien Memorial School
 Daniel K. Inouye International Airport
 Democratic Party of Hawaii
 Demographics of Hawaii
 Detroit Seamount
 Diamond Head
 Diamond Head Classic
 Diamond Head Lighthouse
 Diamond Head Theatre
 Dillingham Airfield
 Discovery Airways
 Discovery and settlement of Hawaii
 Discovery Harbour, Hawaii
 Dole Food Company
 Downtown Honolulu
 Dr. Archibald Neil Sinclair House
 Duke Kahanamoku Invitational Surfing Championship
 Duke Paoa Kahanamoku Lagoon

E
 E Ola Ke Alii Ke Akua
 East Hawaii Cultural Center
 East Honolulu, Hawaii
 East Molokai Volcano
 East–West Center
 Eastern Catholic Community in Hawaii
 Economy of Hawaii
:Category:Economy of Hawaii
commons:Category:Economy of Hawaii
 Eden Roc, Hawaii
 Edict of Toleration (Hawaii)
 Education in Hawaii
:Category:Education in Hawaii
commons:Category:Education in Hawaii
 Education Laboratory School
 Education of Hawaiian Youths Abroad
 Elections in the state of Hawaii
:Category:Hawaii elections
commons:Category:Hawaii elections
 Electoral reform in Hawaii
 Enchanting Floral Gardens of Kula, Maui
 Endemism in the Hawaiian Islands
 Energy in Hawaii
 Environment Hawaii
 Environment of Hawaii
 Environmental issues in Hawaii
commons:Category:Environment of Hawaii
 Episcopal Diocese of Hawaii
 Equality Hawaii
 Ethanol fuel in Hawaii
 Evolution of Hawaiian volcanoes

F

 The Fairmont Orchid
 Falls of Clyde (ship)
 John Baptist de Faria
 Farrington Highway
 Farrington-Kaiser-Kalani Complex Area
 Father Damien Statue
 Faulkes Telescope North
 Feast of the Holy Sovereigns
 Federal Building, United States Post Office and Courthouse (Hilo, Hawaii)
 Federal Detention Center, Honolulu
 Felony murder rule (Hawaii)
 Fern Acres, Hawaii
 Fern Forest, Hawaii
 Fern Grotto
 Festivals in Hawaii
commons:Category:Festivals in Hawaii
 Festival of Lights (Hawaii)
 Fields Open in Hawaii
 Filipinos in Hawaii
 Fire Stations of Oahu
 First Hawaiian Center
 First Hawaiian International Auto Show
 Fasi, Frank
 Fiftieth State
 First Hawaiian Bank
 Flag of the state of Hawaii
 FlyHawaii Airlines
 Folklore in Hawaii
 Foodland Hawaii
 Ford Island
 Forts in Hawaii
Fort Alexander (Hawaii)
Fort Armstrong, Hawaii
Fort DeRussy Military Reservation
Fort Kamehameha
Fort Ruger
Fort Shafter
:Category:Forts in Hawaii
commons:Category:Forts in Hawaii
 Fort Barrette Road
 Foster Botanical Garden
 Four Seasons Resort Hualalai
 French Frigate Shoals
 French invasion of Honolulu

G

 The Garden Island
 Gardner Pinnacles
 Gemini Observatory
 Genetic engineering in Hawaii
 Geography of Hawaii
:Category:Geography of Hawaii
commons:Category:Geography of Hawaii
 George D. Oakley House
 Georges de S. Canavarro House
 Ghost towns of Hawaii
:Category:Ghost towns in Hawaii
commons:Category:Ghost towns in Hawaii
 Glass Beach (Eleele, Hawaii)
 Global warming in Hawaii
 Goat Island (Hawaii)
 Golf clubs and courses in Hawaii
Category:Golf clubs and courses in Hawaii
 Government of the State of Hawaii
:Category:Government of Hawaii
commons:Category:Government of Hawaii
 Governor of the State of Hawaii
List of governors of Hawaii
 Governors of Hawaii (island)
 Grand Wailea Resort
 Grass Island (Hawaii)
 Grassroot Institute
 Great Māhele
 Great Seal of the State of Hawaii
 Greeks in Hawaii
 Green Party of Hawaii
 Greenwell Store
 Grove Farm (Lihue, Hawaii)
 Guitar and Lute Workshop
 Gun laws in Hawaii

H
 H. Alexander Walker Residence
 Haena Archeological Complex
 Hāena, Hawaii County, Hawaii
 Hāena, Kauai County, Hawaii
 Haena State Park
 Haikili
 Haiku
 Haiku Mill
 Haiku-Pauwela, Hawaii
 Haiku Stairs
 Haili Church Choir
 Hakalau, Hawaii
 Hakalau Forest National Wildlife Refuge
 Halalii Lake
 Halaula, Hawaii
 Halawa
 Halawa Correctional Facility
 Halawa, Molokai
 Haleakalā
 Haleakalā National Park
 Haleakala Observatory
 Haleakala Trail
 Haleakala Wilderness
 Hale Halawai O Holualoa
 Halehomaha, Hawaii
 Haleiwa, Hawaii
 Haleiwa Fighter Strip
 Halekulani (hotel)
 Halemaumau
 Hale o Keawe
 Haliimaile, Hawaii
 Hālona Blowhole
 Halulu Lake
 Hamakua
 Hamilton Library (Hawaii)
 Hana
 Hana Airport
 Hana aloha
 Hana Highway
 Hānai
 Hānaiakamalama
 Hanalani Schools
 Hanalei
 Hanalei Bay
 Hanalei Elementary School
 Hanalei Pier
 Hanalei River
 Hanamaulu, Hawaii
 Hanapepe, Hawaii
 Hanapepe massacre
 Hanauma Bay
 Hans L'Orange Field
 Haole
 Hapa
 Hapuna Beach State Recreation Area
 Hauula, Hawaii
Hawaii
 :Category:Hawaii
 commons:Category:Hawaii
commons:Category:Maps of Hawaii
 Hawaii 24/7
 Hawaii (island)
 Hawaii Academy of Arts and Sciences
 Hawaii Academy of Recording Arts
 Hawaii Admission Act
 Hawaii Air Depot Volunteer Corp
 Hawaii Air National Guard
 Hawaii–Aleutian Time Zone
 Hawaii Aloha (unofficial state song)
 Hawaii and the American Civil War
 Hawaii Army National Guard
 Hawaii Audubon Society
 Hawaii Baptist Academy
 Hawaii Belt Road
 Hawaii Board of Education
 Hawaii Bowl
 Hawaii Business
 Hawaii Catholic Herald
 Hawaii Capital Historic District
 Hawaii Center for Volcanology
 Hawaii College of Pharmacy
 Hawaii Collegiate Baseball League
 Hawaii Community College
 Hawaii Community Federal Credit Union
 Hawaii Consolidated Railway
 Hawaii Constitutional Amendment 2
 Hawaii County Band
 Hawaii County, Hawaii
 Hawaii County Police Department
 Hawaii Convention Center
 Hawaii creeper
 Hawaii Cryptologic Center
 Hawaii Davis Cup team
 Hawaii Defense Volunteers
 Hawaii Democratic caucuses, 2008
 Hawaii Democratic caucuses, 2016
 Hawaii Democratic Revolution of 1954
 Hawaii Department of Education
 Hawaii Department of Health
 Hawaii Department of Human Services
 Hawaii Department of Land and Natural Resources
 Hawaii Department of Public Safety
 Hawaii Department of Transportation
 Hawaii Division of Conservation and Resource Enforcement
 Hawaii elections, 2012
 Hawaii Electric Vehicle Demonstration Project
 Hawaii elepaio
 Hawaii Emergency Management Agency
 Hawaii Five-O (five-oh)
 Hawaii Five-0 (five-zero)
 Hawaii gubernatorial election, 1959
 Hawaii gubernatorial election, 1962
 Hawaii gubernatorial election, 1966
 Hawaii gubernatorial election, 1970
 Hawaii gubernatorial election, 1974
 Hawaii gubernatorial election, 1978
 Hawaii gubernatorial election, 1982
 Hawaii gubernatorial election, 1986
 Hawaii gubernatorial election, 1990
 Hawaii gubernatorial election, 1994
 Hawaii gubernatorial election, 1998
 Hawaii gubernatorial election, 2002
 Hawaii gubernatorial election, 2006
 Hawaii gubernatorial election, 2010
 Hawaii gubernatorial election, 2014
 Hawaii gubernatorial election, 2018
 Hawaii Hammerheads
 Hawaii Health Connector
 Hawaii High School Athletic Association
 Hawaii Hochi
 Hawaii hotspot
 Hawaii House Bill 444
 Hawaii House of Representatives
 Hawaii Housing Authority v. Midkiff
  The Hawaii Independent
 Hawaii Institute of Marine Biology
 Hawaii Inter-Island Cable System
 Hawaii Intermediate Court of Appeals
 Hawaii International Conference on Education
 Hawaii International Conference on System Sciences
 Hawaii International Film Festival
 Hawaii Island Journal
 Hawaii Islanders
 Hawaii Kai, Hawaii
 Hawaii Kotohira Jinsha – Hawaii Dazaifu Tenmangu
 Hawaii Land Court
 Hawaiiloa
 Hawaii Loa College
 Hawaii lunar sample displays
 Hawaii mamo
 Hawaii Maritime Center
 Hawaii Marriage Equality Act
 Hawaii Medical Service Association
 Hawaii Music Awards
 Hawaii National Bank
 Hawaii National Guard
 Hawaii Naval Militia
 Hawaii News Now
 Hawaii Nui Brewing Company
 Hawaii Ocean Time-series
 Hawaii Open
 Hawaii Opera Theatre
 Hawaii overprint note
 Hawaii Pacific Baptist Convention
 Hawaii Pacific Sharks
 Hawaii Pacific University
 Hawaii Ponoī (official state song)
 Hawaii Prepaid Health Care Act
 Hawaii Preparatory Academy
 Hawaii Professional Football League
 Hawaii Prosecuting Attorney Office, Criminal Investigations Unit
 Hawaii Public Radio
 Hawaii Public Utilities Commission
 Hawaii Rainbow Wahine basketball
 Hawaii Rainbow Wahine softball
 Hawaii Rainbow Wahine volleyball
 Hawaii Rainbow Warriors and Rainbow Wahine
 Hawaii Rainbow Warriors basketball
 Hawaii Rainbow Warriors football
 Hawaii regional cuisine
 Hawaii Republican caucuses, 2008
 Hawaii Republican Party
 Hawaii Research Center for Futures Studies
 Hawaii Reserves
 Hawaii Route 30
 Hawaii Route 31
 Hawaii Route 37
 Hawaii Route 50
 Hawaii Route 51
 Hawaii Route 56
 Hawaii Route 58
 Hawaii Route 61
 Hawaii Route 63
 Hawaii Route 64
 Hawaii Route 72
 Hawaii Route 76
 Hawaii Route 92
 Hawaii Route 93
 Hawaii Route 200
 Hawaii Route 240
 Hawaii Route 377
 Hawaii Route 440
 Hawaii Route 520
 Hawaii Route 540
 Hawaii Route 541
 Hawaii Route 550
 Hawaii Route 560
 Hawaii Route 570
 Hawaii Route 580
 Hawaii Route 8930
 Hawaii Rugby Football Union
 Hawaii Senate
 Hawaii Senate Bill 232
 Hawaii Senate elections, 2012
 Hawaii Sesquicentennial half dollar
 Hawaii Shingon Mission
 Hawaii Sign Language
 Hawaii Slam
 Hawaii Sports Hall of Fame
 Hawaii Stars
 Hawaii State Art Museum
 Hawaii State Bar Association
 Hawaii State Capitol
 Hawaii State Circuit Courts
 Hawaii State District Courts
 Hawaii State Family Courts
 Hawaii State Federal Credit Union
 Hawaii State Foundation on Culture and the Arts
 Hawaii State Judiciary
 Hawaii State Legislature
 Hawaii State Library
 Hawaii State Open
 Hawaii State Public Library System
 Hawaii statistical areas
 Hawaii State Student Council
 Hawaii Superferry
 Hawaii Symphony
 Hawaii–Tahiti relations
 Hawaii Tax Appeal Court
 Hawaii Technology Academy
 Hawaii Technology Institute
 Hawaii Tennis Open
 Hawaii Territorial Guard
 Hawaii Territory's at-large congressional district
 Hawaii Theatre
 Hawaii Theological Seminary
 Hawaii Tokai International College
 Hawaii Tribune-Herald
 Hawaii Tropical Botanical Garden
 Hawaii Tsunami
 Hawaii trivia
 Hawaii Undersea Research Laboratory
 Hawaii v. Office of Hawaiian Affairs
 Hawaii v. Standard Oil Co. of California
 Hawaii Visitors & Convention Bureau
 Hawaii Volcanoes National Park
 Hawaii Volcanoes Wilderness
 Hawaii wine
 Hawaii Wing Civil Air Patrol
 Hawaii Winter Baseball
 Hawaii–Wyoming football rivalry
 Hawaii Youth Opera Chorus
 Hawaii Youth Symphony
 Hawaii's 1st congressional district
 Hawaii's 2nd congressional district
 Hawaii's at-large congressional district
 Hawaii's congressional districts
 Hawaii's Opportunity Probation with Enforcement
 Hawaii's Story by Hawaii's Queen
 Hawaiian Acres, Hawaii
 Hawaiian Airlines
 Hawaiian Airlines destinations
 Hawaiian alphabet
 Hawaiian aquaculture
 Hawaiian architecture
 Hawaiian Beaches, Hawaii
 Hawaiian Braille
 Hawaiian Congressional Delegations
 Hawaiian Division
 Hawaiian dollar
 Hawaiian Ecosystems at Risk project
 Hawaiian Electric Company
 Hawaiian Electric Industries
 Hawaiian–Emperor seamount chain
 Hawaiian Entomological Society
 Hawaiian eruption
 Hawaiian ethnobiology
 Hawaiian Falls
 Hawaiian folklore
 Hawaiian geography (overview)
 Hawaiian goose (state bird)
 Hawaiian hibiscus
 Hawaiian Historical Society
 Hawaiian home land
 Hawaiian honeycreeper
 Hawaiian Humane Society
 Hawaiian Islanders
 Hawaiian Island Charts
 Hawaiian Islands
 Hawaiian Islands Biosphere Reserve
 Hawaiian Islands Humpback Whale National Marine Sanctuary
 Hawaiian Islands Invitational
 Hawaiian Islands Land Trust
 Hawaiian kinship
 Hawaiian language
 Hawaiian lava sledding
 Hawaiian Legacy Reforestation Initiative
 Hawaiian literature
 Hawaiian Mission Academy
 Hawaiian Mission Houses Historic Site and Archives
 Hawaiian Missionaries (stamps)
 Hawaiian Music Hall of Fame
 Hawaiian mythology
 Hawaiian name
 Hawaiian News Company
 Hawaiian Ocean View, Hawaii
 Hawaiian Organic Act
 Hawaiian Paradise Park, Hawaii
 Hawaiian Philatelic Society
 Hawaiian phonology
 Hawaiian Pidgin
 Hawaiian pizza
 Hawaiian Potters Guild
 Hawaiian Pro
 Hawaiian Punch
 Hawaiian quilt
 Hawaiian Railway Society
 Hawaiian rebellions (1887–95)
 Hawaiian religion
 Hawaiian Renaissance
 Hawaiian scale
 Hawaiian sovereignty movement
 Hawaiian studies
 Hawaiian Sugar Planters' Association
 Hawaiian sugar strike of 1946
 Hawaiian Tel Federal Credit Union
 Hawaiian Telcom
 Hawaiian Tropic
 Hawaiian tropical dry forests
 Hawaiian tropical high shrublands
 Hawaiian tropical low shrublands
 Hawaiian tropical rainforests
 Hawaiian Trough
 Hawaiian Volcano Observatory
 Hawaiian Way Fund
 Hawaiiana
 Hawaiianize
 The Hawaiians (WFL)
 Hawi, Hawaii
 Hawi Wind Farm
 He Mele Lahui Hawaii
 Heeia, Hawaii
 Heeia State Park
 Heiau
 Henry Perrine Baldwin High School
 Heritage railroads in Hawaii
 commons:Category:Heritage railroads in Hawaii
 HI – United States Postal Service postal code for the State of Hawaii
 Hickam Air Force Base
 Hickam Field
 Hickam Housing, Hawaii
 High Altitude Observatory
 Highway routes in Hawaii
 Hiilawe Waterfall
 Hiking trails in Hawaii
 commons:Category:Hiking trails in Hawaii
 Hilina Slump
 Hilo
 Hilo Art Museum
 Hilo Bay
 Hilo High School
 Hilo International Airport
 Hilo Masonic Lodge Hall-Bishop Trust Building
 Hilo massacre
 Hilo (soil)
 Hilton Hawaiian Village
 Hilton Waikoloa Village USTA Challenger
 History of Hawaii
Historical outline of Hawaii
:Category:History of Hawaii
commons:Category:History of Hawaii
 History of Maui
 Hokukano-Ualapue Complex
 Holaniku at Keahole Point
 Holualoa Bay
 Holualoa, Hawaii
 Holy Ghost Catholic Church (Kula, Hawaii)
 Holy Trinity Catholic Church (Honolulu)
 Home Rule Party of Hawaii
 Honalo, Hawaii
 Hōnaunau, Hawaii
 Honaunau-Napoopoo, Hawaii
 Honokaa, Hawaii
 Honokaa High & Intermediate School
 Honokohau Harbor
 Honolua, Hawaii
 Honolulu, royal, republican, territorial, and state capital since 1845
 The Honolulu Advertiser
 Honolulu City Council
 Honolulu Community College
 Honolulu County, Hawaii
 Honolulu Courthouse riot
 Honolulu Hale
 Honolulu Harbor
 Honolulu International Airport
 Honolulu
 Honolulu Marathon
 Honolulu mayoral election, 2010
 Honolulu mayoral election, 2012
 Honolulu mayoral election, 2016
 Honolulu molasses spill
 Honolulu Museum of Art
 Honolulu Museum of Art Spalding House
 Honolulu Police Department
 Honolulu Rail Transit
 Honolulu Stadium
 Honolulu Star-Advertiser
 Honolulu Star-Bulletin
 Honolulu Tudor–French Norman Cottages
 Honolulu University
 Honolulu Waldorf School
 Honolulu Weekly
 Honomu, Hawaii
 Honouliuli Internment Camp
 Honpa Hongwanji Mission of Hawaii
 Hookipa
 Hoolehua, Hawaii
 Hoomaluhia Botanical Garden
 Hooponopono
 Hospital Rock Tunnels
 House of Kamehameha
 House of Kawānanakoa
 House of Keawe
 House of Laanui
 Hualālai
 Hualalai Academy
 Hula
 Huleia National Wildlife Refuge
 Hulihee Palace
 Hurricane Iwa
 Hurricane Iniki

I
Images of Hawaii
commons:Category:Hawaii
 Immaculate Conception Catholic Church (Lihue, Hawaii)
 Independence Day (Hawaii)
 Independent (Kuokoa) Party
 Insects of Hawaii
 Institute for Astronomy
 Interstate H-1
 Interstate H-2
 Interstate H-3
 Interstate H-201
 Invasive species in Hawaii
 Ipu
 Ironman World Championship
 Iroquois Point, Hawaii
 Isaac Hale Beach Park
 Isaacs Art Center
 Islam Day (Hawaii)
 Islam in Hawaii
 Island Air (Hawaii)
 Island Sports Media
 Island of Hawaii
 Islands of Hawaii
Hawaii
 Island Pacific Energy
Kahoolawe
Kauai
Lānai
Maui
Molokai
Niihau
Oahu
 Island School (Hawaii)
 Izumo Taishakyo Mission of Hawaii

J
 James Campbell High School
 James Campbell National Wildlife Refuge
 James Clerk Maxwell Telescope
 Japanese in Hawaii
 Japanese loanwords in Hawaii
 Le Jardin Academy
 Jingū Seamount
 John Guild House
 John H. Wilson Tunnels
 John Young Museum of Art
 Joint Astronomy Centre
 Joint Base Pearl Harbor–Hickam
 Joseph W. Podmore Building

K
 Ka Nupepa Kuokoa
 Kaaawa, Hawaii
 Kaahumanu Church
 Kaahumanu Society
 Kaala
 Kaanapali
 Kaanapali Airport
 Kaena Point
 Kaena Ridge
 Ka Lae (south cape)
 Ka Leo O Hawaii
 Ka Loko Reservoir
 Kahakuloa, Hawaii
 Kāhala, Hawaii
 Kahōālii
 Kahuku Army Air Field
 Kahului Railroad
 Kahaluu
 Kahaluu Bay
 Kahaluu-Keauhou, Hawaii
 Kahaluu Taro Loi
 Kahanu Garden
 Kaheawa Wind Power
 Kahiko
 Kahikolu Church
 Kahili Adventist School
 Kahoolawe
 Kahuku, Hawaii
 Kahuku High & Intermediate School
 Kahuku Wind Farm
 Kahului Airport
 Kahuna
 Kai Opae
 Kaia Ranch Tropical Botanical Gardens
 Kailua, Hawaii County, Hawaii
 Kailua High School
 Kailua, Honolulu County, Hawaii
 Kailua-Kona
 Kaimū
 Kaimuki
 Kaimuki High School
 Kaimuki-McKinley-Roosevelt Complex Area
 Kainaliu, Hawaii
 Kakaako
 Kakaako Pumping Station
 Kakaako Waterfront Park
 Kakahaia National Wildlife Refuge
 Kalaeloa, Hawaii
 Kalaeloa Airport
 Kalaheo, Hawaii
 Kalaheo High School
 Kalākaua's 1881 world tour
 Kalakaua Park
 Kalalau Trail
 Kalani High School
 Kalani Oceanside Retreat
 Kalaoa, Hawaii
 Kalapana
 Kalaupapa
 Kalaupapa Airport
 Kalaupapa National Historical Park
 Kalawao, Hawaii
 Kalepolepo Fishpond
 Kalihi
 Kalihiwai, Hawaii
 Kaloko-Honokōhau National Historical Park
 Kalopa State Recreation Area
 Kalua
 Kamaaina
 Kamaʻehuakanaloa Seamount
 Kamakahonu
 Kamaka Ukulele
 Kamakou
 Kamapuaa
 Kamehameha Day
 Kamehameha Highway
 Kamehameha Schools
 Kamehameha Schools Hawaii Campus
 Kamehameha Statue (Honolulu cast)
 Kamehameha Statues
 Kamohoalii
 Kanaha Pond State Wildlife Sanctuary
 Kanaiolowalu
 Kanaloa
 Kāne
 Kanemitsu Bakery
 Kāneohe Bay
 Kaneohe Ranch Building
 Kaniakapupu
 Kapa
 Kapaa, Hawaii
 Kapaau, Hawaii
 Kapālama
 Kapalua, Hawaii
 Kapalua Airport
 Kapalua International
 Kapalua LPGA Classic
 Kapiolani Community College
 Kapiolani Community College Cactus Garden
 Kapiolani Park
 Kapoho, Hawaii
 Kapolei, Hawaii
 Kapolei High School
 Kapu
 Kau, Hawaii
 Kau High and Pahala Elementary School
 Kaū Desert
 Kauai
 Kauai Island Utility Cooperative
 Kauai Community College
 Kauai County Fair
 Kauai Educational Association for Science and Astronomy
 Kauhola Point Light
 Kauikeaouli Hale
 Kaula
 Kaulaināiwi Island
 "Kaulana Na Pua" (song protesting 1893 overthrow and 1898 annexation)
 Kaumahina State Wayside Park
 Kaumakani, Hawaii
 Kaunakakai, Hawaii
 Kaunaoa Bay
 Kaunolu Village Site
 Kaupo, Hawaii
 Kaupulehu, Hawaii
 Kawaihae, Hawaii
 Kawaiahao Church
 Kawaikini
 Kawai Nui Marsh
 Kawela Bay, Hawaii
 Kawelikoa Point
 Kazumura Cave
 KDDB
 Ke Kula o Nawahiokalaniopuu
 Keaau, Hawaii
 Keaau High School
 Keahole Point
 Keaiwa Heiau State Recreation Area
 Kealakekua, Hawaii
 Kealakekua Bay
 Kealia, Hawaii
 Kealia Pond National Wildlife Refuge
 Keanae, Hawaii
 Keanae Arboretum
 Keauhou Bay
 Keauhou, Hawaii
 Keauhou Holua Slide
 Keawaiki Bay
 Kehena Beach
 Kekaha, Hawaii
 Kekaha Kai State Park
 Keokea, Hawaii County, Hawaii
 Keokea, Maui County, Hawaii
 Keōua Hale
 Kewalo Basin
 KHNL
 Kidnapping of Kalaniōpuu by Captain James Cook
 Kihei, Hawaii
 Kikiaola
 Kīlauea
 Kilauea, Hawaii
 Kīlauea Iki
 Kilauea Light
 Kilauea Military Camp
 Kilauea Plantation
 Kilauea Point National Wildlife Refuge
 King David Kalakaua Building
 King Kekaulike High School
 King Kamehameha Golf Course Clubhouse
 Kingdom of Hawaii, 1810–1894
 Kingdom of Hawaii–United States relations
 Kipahulu, Hawaii
 Kipu Falls
 Koa Coffee Plantation
 Kohala
 Kohala District Courthouse
 Kohala, Hawaii
 Kohala High School
 Kohala Historical Sites State Monument
 Kohala Mountain Road
 Kohanaiki Beach Park
 Kōkee State Park
 Koko Crater Botanical Garden
 Kokomo, Hawaii
 Kolekole Beach Park
 Koloa, Hawaii
 Kona coffee
 Kona Coffee Living History Farm
 Kona District, Hawaii
 Kona Hawaii Temple
 Kona International Airport
 Kona Pacific Public Charter School
 Kona storm
 Konawaena High School
 Koolau Range
 Ko Olina Resort
 Ko Olina Station and Center
 Korean immigration to Hawaii
 Kū
 Kuakini Medical Center
 Kualapuu, Hawaii
 Kualoa Ranch
 Kualoa Regional Park
 Kuamoo Burials
 Kūē Petitions
 Kuhimana (god)
 Kuhina Nui
 Kuhio Beach Park
 Kukaniloko Birth Site 
 Kukini
 Kukuihaele, Hawaii
 Kukui Heiau
 Kula
 Kula Botanical Garden
 Kuleana Act of 1850 (Hawaii)
 Kumu Kahua Theatre
 Kunia Camp, Hawaii
 Kure Atoll
 Kurtistown, Hawaii

L
 L&L Hawaiian Barbecue
 Laaloa Bay
 Laa Maomao
 Labor Party (Hawaii)
 Ladd & Co.
 Lahaina, Hawaii, royal capital 1820–1845
 Lahaina Banyan Court Park
 Lahaina Gateway
 Lahaina, Kaanapali and Pacific Railroad
 Lahaina Roads
 Lahainaluna High School
 Lakes of Hawaii
 commons:Category:Lakes of Hawaii
 Laie, Hawaii
 Laie Hawaii Temple
 Lake Waiau
 Lalamilo Wells
 Lānai
 Lānai Airport
 Lanai (architecture)
 Lānai City
 Lanai High and Elementary School
 Lanakila Baptist High School
 Lanakila Baptist Schools
 Landmarks in Hawaii
 commons:Category:Landmarks in Hawaii
 Languages of Hawaii
 Lani (heaven)
 Lanikai Beach
 Lapakahi State Historical Park
 Laplace Affair
 Launiupoko, Hawaii
 Laupāhoehoe
 Laupāhoehoe Community Public Charter School
 Lava Flow Hazard Zones
 Lava Tree State Monument
 Lawai, Hawaii
 Laysan
 Leeward Community College
 Legal status of Hawaii
 Lehua
 Lei (garland)
 Lei Day
 Leilani Estates, Hawaii
 Leilehua High School
 Legislature of the Kingdom of Hawaii
 LGBT history in Hawaii
 LGBT rights in Hawaii
 Lemon Wond Holt House
 Les Murakami Stadium
 Libertarian Party of Hawaii
 Liberty House (US)
 Lieutenant Governor of Hawaii
 Līhue
 Līhue Airport
 Liliuokalani Botanical Garden
 Liliuokalani Park and Gardens
 Liloa's Kāei
 Limahuli Garden and Preserve
 Limu o Pele
 Lisianski Island
 Literature in Hawaii
 Living Art Marine Center
 Loco moco
 Lomilomi massage
 Longline bycatch in Hawaii
 Lono
 Lualualei, Hawaii
 Luau
 Lumahai River
 Lunalilo
 Lunalilo Mausoleum
 Lutheran High School of Hawaii
 Lyman House Memorial Museum
 Lyon Arboretum

M
 Maalaea, Hawaii
 Maehara Stadium
 Mahalo
 Mahinahina, Hawaii
 Mahiole
 Māhukona
 Mahukona, Hawaii
 Māili, Hawaii
 Mākaha, Hawaii
 Mākaha Valley, Hawaii
 Makahiku Falls
 Makakilo, Hawaii
 Makaleha Mountains
 Makana
 Makanalua, Hawaii
 Makani Kai Air
 Makapuu
 Makapuu Point
 Makapuu Point Light
 Makawao, Hawaii
 Makawao Union Church
 Makena State Park
 Malia (canoe)
 Mānana
 Manele, Hawaii
 Manoa
 Manoa Falls
 Manoa Falls Trail
 Manoa (journal)
 Manta ray night dive
 Manuka State Wayside Park
Maps of Hawaii
commons:Category:Maps of Hawaii
 Maria Lanakila Catholic Church
 Marine Corps Air Station Kaneohe Bay
 Maro Reef
 Maui
 Maui Academy of Performing Arts
 Maui Film Festival
 Māui (Hawaiian mythology)
 Maui High School
 Maui Invitational Tournament
 Maui Nui 
 Maui Nui Botanical Gardens
 Maui Ocean Center
 Maui solar telescope protests
 Maui Trade Dollars
 Mauna Kea
 Mauna Kea Beach Hotel
 Mauna Kea Ice Age Reserve
 Mauna Kea Observatories
 Mauna Kea State Recreation Area
 Maunaloa, Hawaii
 Mauna Loa
 Mauna Loa Solar Observatory
 Maunawili, Hawaii
 Marine Corps Base Hawaii
 Massie-Kahahawai Case
 Mayor of Hawaii County
 Mayor of Honolulu
 McBryde Garden
 Meadow Gold Dairies (Hawaii)
 Media in Hawaii
 Media in Honolulu
 Meiji Seamount
 Mele (Hawaiian language)
 Menehune
 Menehune Fishpond
 Merrie Monarch Festival
 Midway Atoll
 Mililani
 Mililani High School
 Milolii, Hawaii
 Minister to Hawaii
 Ministry of Finance (Hawaii)
 Ministry of Foreign Affairs (Hawaii)
 Ministry of the Interior (Hawaii)
 Moana Hotel
 Moanalua
 Moanalua Elementary School
 Moanalua High School
 Moiliili, Hawaii
 Moir Gardens
 Mokolea Rock
 Mokolii
 Mokuaikaua Church
 Mokuāina o Hawaii
 Mokulēia, Hawaii
 Mokulele Airlines
 Moku Manu
 Mokuula
 Molii Fishpond
 Moloaa Bay
 Molokai
 Molokai Airport
 Molokai Advertiser-News
 Molokai Airport
 Molokini
 Moomomi
 Morse Field (Hawaii)
 Most Sacred Heart of Jesus Catholic Church (Hawi, Hawaii)
 Mount Waialeale
 Mountain Apple Company
 Mountain View, Hawaii
Mountains of Hawaii
 commons:Category:Mountains of Hawaii
 Museums in Hawaii
:Category:Museums in Hawaii
commons:Category:Museums in Hawaii
 Music of Hawaii
commons:Category:Music of Hawaii
:Category:Musical groups from Hawaii
:Category:Musicians from Hawaii
 Muslim Association of Hawaii
 Muumuu

N
 Na Āina Kai Botanical Gardens
 Na Hoku Hanohano Awards
 Na Koa Ikaika Maui
 Na Mokulua
 Nā Pali Coast State Park
 Naalehu, Hawaii
 Nahiku, Hawaii
 Nānākuli, Hawaii
 Nanawale Estates, Hawaii
 Nani Mau Gardens
 Napili, Hawaii
 Napili-Honokowai, Hawaii
 NASA Infrared Telescope Facility
 Nation of Hawaii (organization)
 National Guard of Hawaii
 National Liberal Party (Hawaii)
 National Memorial Cemetery of the Pacific
 National Party (Hawaii)
 National Pearl Harbor Remembrance Day
 National Reform Party (Hawaii)
 National Register of Historic Places listings in Hawaii
 National Register of Historic Places listings in Hawaii Volcanoes National Park
 National Register of Historic Places listings in Oahu
 National Tropical Botanical Garden
 Native Hawaiian Legal Corporation
 Natural Area Reserves System Hawaii
 Natural Energy Laboratory of Hawaii Authority
 Natural history of Hawaii
 commons:Category:Natural history of Hawaii
 Native cuisine of Hawaii
 Native Hawaiians
 Naval Air Station Barbers Point
 Naval Auxiliary Landing Field Ford Island
 Naval Station Pearl Harbor
 Navy Region Hawaii
 Nawiliwili Beach Park
 Neal S. Blaisdell Center
 Necker Island (Hawaii)
 Newlands Resolution
 Nihoa
 Niihau
 Ninole
 Ninole Hills
 Nippu Jiji
 Nintoku Seamount
 Niumalu Beach Park
 North Koolaupoko, Hawaii
 Northwestern Hawaiian Islands
 November 2000 Hawaii floods
 Nuuanu Pali
 Nuuanu Slide
 NWA Hawaii Heavyweight Championship
 NWA Hawaii Tag Team Championship
 NWA Pacific International Championship

O
 Oahu
 Oahu Cattlemen's Association Paniolo Hall of Fame
 Oahu Cemetery
 Oahu Interscholastic Association
 Oahu Open
 Oahu Railway and Land Company
 Ocean Pointe, Hawaii
 Office of Hawaiian Affairs
 Ojin Seamount
 Old Sugar Mill of Koloa
 Olinda, Hawaii
 Olomana High & Intermediate School
 Olomana (mountain)
 Olowalu, Hawaii
 Onion House
 Onizuka Center for International Astronomy
 Opposition to the Mauna Kea Observatories
 Opposition to the overthrow of the Kingdom of Hawaii
 Orchidlands Estates, Hawaii
 Orders, decorations, and medals of Hawaii
 Orthodox Church in Hawaii
 Our Lady Queen of Angels Catholic Church (Kula, Hawaii)
 Our Lady of Good Counsel Catholic Church (Pearl City, Hawaii)
 Our Lady of the Mount Catholic Church (Honolulu)
 Outdoor sculptures in Hawaii
commons:Category:Outdoor sculptures in Hawaii
 Overthrow of the Kingdom of Hawaii

P
 Paauhau, Hawaii
 Paauilo, Hawaii
 Pacific Aviation Museum Pearl Harbor
 Pacific Buddhist Academy
 Pacific Roller Derby
 Pacific Tsunami Museum
 Pacific Tsunami Warning Center
 Pacific Western University (Hawaii)
 Pahala
 Pahala Formation
 Pahoa, Hawaii
 Pahoa High and Intermediate School
 Paia, Hawaii
 Pakaa
 Pakala Village, Hawaii
Palaces in Hawaii
commons:Category:Palaces in Hawaii
 Palace Theater (Hilo, Hawaii)
 Paleontology in Hawaii
 Pali Momi Medical Center
 Palolo, Hawaii
 Panaewa Rainforest Zoo
 Pāpaaloa, Hawaii
 Papahānaumokuākea Marine National Monument
 Papaikou, Hawaii
 Papakolea Beach
 Parker Ranch
 Parker School (Kamuela, Hawaii)
 Pauahi (crater)
 Paukaa, Hawaii
 Paulet Affair (1843)
 Pauoa, Hawaii
 Paupueo
 Peahi, Hawaii
 Pearl and Hermes Atoll
 Pearl City
 Pearl City High School (Hawaii)
 Pearl Harbor
 Pearl Harbor Elementary School
 Pearl Harbor National Wildlife Refuge
 Pearlridge
 Pearl Harbor Memorial
 Pele (deity)
 Penguin Bank
 People from Hawaii
:Category:People from Hawaii
commons:Category:People from Hawaii
:Category:People by county in Hawaii
 Pepeekeo, Hawaii
 Pepeopae
 La Perouse Bay
 Pidgin Hawaiian
 Plantation Estate
 Plate lunch
 Pohakuloa Training Area
 Poipu, Hawaii
 Poke (fish salad)
 Polipoli Spring State Recreation Area
 Political party strength in Hawaii
 Politics of Hawaii
:Category:Politics of Hawaii
commons:Category:Politics of Hawaii
 Pololū Valley
 Polynesian Adventure Tours
 Polynesian Cultural Center
 Polynesian mythology
 Polynesian Voyaging Society
 Pono
 Poouli
 Port Allen, Hawaii
 Port Allen Airport
 Portuguese immigration to Hawaii
 Postage stamps and postal history of Hawaii
 Prefecture Apostolic of the Sandwich Islands for the Catholic missionary history
 President Theodore Roosevelt High School
 President William McKinley High School
 Prince Kuhio Federal Building
 Prince Kuhio Plaza
 Princeville
 Princeville Airport
 Proposed 1893 Constitution of the Kingdom of Hawaii
 Protected areas of Hawaii
commons:Category:Protected areas of Hawaii
 Provisional Government of Hawaii, 1893–1894
 Puaa-2 Agricultural Fields Archeological District
 Puako, Hawaii
 Pua Mau Place Arboretum and Botanical Garden
 Puerto Rican immigration to Hawaii
 Puhi, Hawaii
 Puka shell
 Pukalani, Hawaii
 Pulu (material)
 Puna, Hawaii
 Punahou Circle apartments
 Punahou School
 Puna-Kāu Historic District
 Punaluu Black Sand Beach
 Punaluu, Hawaii
 Punchbowl Crater
 Puuhonua o Hōnaunau National Historical Park
 Puu Huluhulu (Hawaii Route 200)
 Puukoholā Heiau National Historic Site
 Puu Kukui
 Puunene, Hawaii
 Puu o Mahuka Heiau State Monument
 Puuokeokeo
 Puuopae Bridge
 Puu Ōō
 Puuwai, Hawaii

Q
 Queen Emma of Hawaii
 Queen Emma Party
 Queen Kapiolani
 Queen's Bath
 The Queen's Medical Center

R
 Radiocarbon dating in Hawaii
 Rainbow Falls (Hawaii)
 Reciprocal beneficiary relationships in Hawaii
 Reform Party (Hawaii)
 Religion in Hawaii
:Category:Religion in Hawaii
commons:Category:Religion in Hawaii
 Republic of Hawaii, 1894–1898
 Resurrection of the Lord Catholic Church (Waipahu, Hawaii)
 Richardson Beach
 RIMPAC
 Roberts Hawaii
 Rock fever
 Rock formations in Hawaii
commons:Category:Rock formations in Hawaii
 Roman Catholic Diocese of Honolulu
 Royal Guards of Hawaii
 Royal Hawaiian Agricultural Society Medal
 Royal Hawaiian Band
 Royal Hawaiian Hotel
 Royal Kunia, Hawaii
 Royal Mausoleum of Hawaii
 Royal Order of Kalākaua
 Royal Order of Kamehameha I
 Royal School (Hawaii)
 Rulers of the Hawaiian Islands
 Russian Fort Elizabeth

S
 S. Hata Building
 Sacred Falls State Park
 Sacred Hearts Academy
 Sadie Seymour Botanical Gardens
 Saimin
 Saint Ann Catholic Church (Kaneohe, Hawaii)
 Saint Anthony Catholic Church (Honolulu)
 Saint Augustine by the Sea Catholic Church
 Saint John the Baptist Catholic Church (Honolulu, Hawaii)
 Saint Joseph Catholic Church (Hilo, Hawaii)
 Saint Joseph Catholic Church (Makawao, Hawaii)
 Saint Louis School
 Saint Raphael Catholic Church (Koloa, Hawaii)
 Saint Theresa Catholic Church (Kekaha, Hawaii)
 Salt Lake, Hawaii 
 Salvation Army Waioli Tea Room
 Same-sex marriage in Hawaii
 Sand Island (Hawaii)
 Sandy Beach, Hawaii
 Sandwich Islands
 Schofield Barracks
 Scouting in Hawaii
 Sea Life Park Hawaii
 Seal of Hawaii
 Settlements in Hawaii
Cities in Hawaii
Towns in Hawaii
Census Designated Places in Hawaii
List of ghost towns in Hawaii
List of places in Hawaii
 Shaka sign
 Sheraton Hotels and Resorts Hawaii
 Shidler College of Business
 Slack-key guitar
 SMART Magazine
 Solar power in Hawaii
 Sony Open in Hawaii
 Sovereignty movement in Hawaii
 Sovereignty Restoration Day
 Spanish immigration to Hawaii
 Sports in Hawaii
commons:Category:Sports in Hawaii
 Sports venues in Hawaii
commons:Category:Sports venues in Hawaii
 Spreckelsville, Hawaii
 St. Benedict's Catholic Church (Honaunau, Hawaii)
 Star of the Sea Painted Church
 State Flag
 State legislature
 State of Hawaii
Government of the State of Hawaii
Government of the State of Hawaii
:Category:Government of Hawaii
commons:Category:Government of Hawaii
 St. Anthony High School (Wailuku, Hawaii)
 St. Joseph High School (Hilo, Hawaii)
 St. Michael the Archangel Church (Kailua-Kona, Hawaii)
 Stan Sheriff Center
 State of Hawaii Department of the Attorney General
 Statehood Day (Hawaii)
 Straub Medical Center
 Structures in Hawaii
commons:Category: Buildings and structures in Hawaii
 Subaru Telescope
 Submillimeter Array
 Submillimetre Common-User Bolometer Array
 Sugar plantations in Hawaii
 Suiko Seamount
 Sunset Beach (Oahu)
 Supreme Court of Hawaii
 Symbols of the State of Hawaii

Hawaii state bird: Nēnē (Branta sandvicensis)
Hawaii state dance: Hula
Hawaii state fish: Humuhumunukunukuāpuaa (Rhinecanthus rectangulus)
Hawaii state flag: Flag of the State of Hawaii
Hawaii state flower: Mao hau hele (Hibiscus brackenridgei)
Hawaii state food: Coconut muffin (unofficial)
Hawaii state gem: Black coral
Hawaii state individual sport: Surfing
Hawaii state language: Hawaiian language
Hawaii state mammal: Hawaiian monk seal (Monachus schauinslandi)
Hawaii state marine mammal: Humpback whale (Megaptera novaeangliae)
Hawaii state nickname: Aloha State
Hawaii state reptile: Gold dust day gecko (Phelsuma laticauda laticauda) (unofficial)
Hawaii state seal: Great Seal of the State of Hawaii
Hawaii state slogan:  The Islands of Aloha
Hawaii state soil: Hilo Soil (unofficial)
Hawaii state song:  "Hawai`i Pono`i"
Hawaii state spirit:  Aloha
Hawaii state team sport: Outrigger canoe racing
Hawaii state tartan: Hawaii State Tartan (unofficial)
Hawaii state tree: Kukui tree (Aleurites moluccanus)

T
 Tantalus (Oahu)
 Team Hawaii
 Telephone area codes in Hawaii
 Temple Emanu-El (Honolulu, Hawaii)
 Tern Island (Hawaii)
 Territory of Hawaii, 1898–1959
 Tetsuo Harano Tunnels
 Theatres in Hawaii
commons:Category:Theatres in Hawaii
 TheBus
 Thirty Meter Telescope
 Thirty Meter Telescope protests
 Thomas Square
 Thrum's Hawaiian Annual
 Time in Hawaii
 Timeline of Honolulu
 Toast Hawaii
 Tobacco MSA (Hawaii)
 Tourism in Hawaii 
 Trans Executive Airlines 
 TransPacific Hawaii College
 Transportation in Hawaii
:Category:Transportation in Hawaii
commons:Category:Transport in Hawaii
 Tripler Army Medical Center
 Tropical Gardens of Maui
 Trump International Hotel and Tower (Honolulu)
 Turtle Bay Championship
 Turtle Bay Resort

 Upolu Airport

U
 Ua Mau ke Ea o ka Āina i ka Pono
 UH88
 Ukulele (ukulele)
 Ukupanipo
 Ulukau: The Hawaiian Electronic Library
 Ulupau Crater
 Ulupō Heiau State Historic Site
 Ulupono Initiative
 Unification of Hawaii
 United States of America
States of the United States of America
United States Attorney for the District of Hawaii
United States census statistical areas of Hawaii
United States congressional delegations from Hawaii
United States congressional districts in Hawaii
 United Kingdom Infrared Telescope
United States Court of Appeals for the Ninth Circuit
United States District Court for the District of Hawaii
United States federal recognition of Native Hawaiians
United States House of Representatives elections in Hawaii, 2000
United States House of Representatives elections in Hawaii, 2002
United States House of Representatives elections in Hawaii, 2004
United States House of Representatives elections in Hawaii, 2006
United States House of Representatives elections in Hawaii, 2008
United States House of Representatives elections in Hawaii, 2010
United States House of Representatives elections in Hawaii, 2012
United States House of Representatives elections in Hawaii, 2014
United States House of Representatives elections in Hawaii, 2016
United States Immigration Office (Honolulu, Hawaii)
United States Minister to Hawaii
United States presidential elections in Hawaii
United States presidential election in Hawaii, 1960
United States presidential election in Hawaii, 1964 
United States presidential election in Hawaii, 1968
United States presidential election in Hawaii, 1972
United States presidential election in Hawaii, 1976
United States presidential election in Hawaii, 1980
United States presidential election in Hawaii, 1984
United States presidential election in Hawaii, 1988
United States presidential election in Hawaii, 1992
United States presidential election in Hawaii, 1996
United States presidential election in Hawaii, 2000
United States presidential election in Hawaii, 2004
United States presidential election in Hawaii, 2008
United States presidential election in Hawaii, 2012
United States presidential election in Hawaii, 2016
United States representatives from Hawaii
United States senators from Hawaii
United States Senate election in Hawaii, 1976
United States Senate election in Hawaii, 1982
United States Senate election in Hawaii, 1986
United States Senate election in Hawaii, 1988
United States Senate special election in Hawaii, 1990 
United States Senate election in Hawaii, 1992
United States Senate election in Hawaii, 1994
United States Senate election in Hawaii, 1998
United States Senate election in Hawaii, 2000
United States Senate election in Hawaii, 2004
United States Senate election in Hawaii, 2006
United States Senate election in Hawaii, 2008
United States Senate election in Hawaii, 2010
 United States Senate election in Hawaii, 2012
United States Senate special election in Hawaii, 2014
 United States Senate election in Hawaii, 2016
United States Senate election in Hawaii, 2018
 University of Hawaii
University of Hawaii alumni
University of Hawaii faculty
 University of Hawaii at Hilo 
 University of Hawaii at Hilo Botanical Gardens
 University of Hawaii Board of Publications
 University of Hawaii Marching Band
 University of Hawaii Maui College
 University of Hawaii Press
 University of Hawaii–West Oahu
 U.S. Army Museum of Hawaii
 US-HI – ISO 3166-2:US region code for the State of Hawaii
 USS Arizona Memorial
 USS Missouri Museum

V
 Valley of the Temples Memorial Park
 Vehicle registration plates of Hawaii
 Village Park, Hawaii
 Violet Lake
 Vintage Cave Club
 Volcano, Hawaii
 Volcano Block Building
 Volcano House
 Volcano Winery
 Volcanoes National Park

W
 W. H. Shipman House
 W. M. Keck Observatory
 Wahiawa
 Wahiawa Botanical Garden
 Wākea
 Waiakea
 Waiakea High School
 Waiakea Mission Station-Hilo Station
 Waialae
 Waialae Country Club
 Waialua, Hawaii
 Waialua High and Intermediate School
 Waialua Sugar Mill
 Waianae, Hawaii
 Waianae High School
 Waianae Range
 Waianapanapa State Park
 Waihee-Waiehu, Hawaii
 Waihilau Falls
 Waikapu, Hawaii
 Waikīkī
 Waikīkī Aquarium
 Waikīkī Beach
 Waikiki BeachBoys
 Waikiki Natatorium War Memorial
 Waikoloa Beach
 Waikoloa Championships
 Waikoloa Village, Hawaii
 Waikolu, Hawaii
 Wailau
 Wailea, Hawaii
 Wailea-Makena, Hawaii
 Wailoa River State Recreation Area
 Wailua
 Wailua Falls
 Wailuā Homesteads, Hawaii
 Wailua, Maui County, Hawaii
 Wailua River
 Wailua River State Park
 Wailua Valley State Wayside Park
 Wailuku, Hawaii
 Wailuku Civic Center Historic District
 Wailuku River
 Waimalu, Hawaii
 Waimānalo
 Waimanalo Beach, Hawaii
 Waimanu Valley
 Waimea Bay, Hawaii
 Waimea High School
 Waimea Canyon State Park
 Waimea, Hawaii County, Hawaii
 Waimea, Kauai County, Hawaii
 Waimea-Kohala Airport
 Waimea River (Hawaii)
 Waimea Valley
 Wainaku, Hawaii
 Wainiha, Hawaii
 Waiohinu, Hawaii
 Waiola Church
 Waioli Mission District
 Waipahu High School
 Waipio, Hawaii
 Waipio Acres, Hawaii
 Waipio Peninsula Soccer Stadium
 Waipio Valley
 Wananalua Congregational Church
 Wao Kele o Puna
 War Memorial Stadium (Hawaii)
 Washington Place
 Water parks in Hawaii
 Waterfalls of Hawaii
commons:Category:Waterfalls of Hawaii
 Weinberg Foundation
 Welaahilaninui
 West Hawaii Explorations Academy
 West Loch Estate, Hawaii
 West Maui Mountains
 West Molokai Volcano
 Westin Kāanapali Ocean Resort Villas
 Wet'n'Wild Hawaii
 West Hawaii Today
 Wheeler Army Airfield
 Whitmore Village, Hawaii
 Wiki Wiki Shuttle
 Wilcox Medical Center
 Wilcox rebellion of 1889
 Wilcox rebellions
 William S. Richardson School of Law
 Wind power in Hawaii
 Windward Community College
 Windward Viaducts
 Wo Hing Society Hall
 World War II Valor in the Pacific National Monument

Wikimedia
Wikimedia Commons:Category:Hawaii
commons:Category:Maps of Hawaii
Wikinews:Category:Hawaii
Wikinews:Portal:Hawaii
Wikipedia Category:Hawaii
Wikipedia Portal:Hawaii
Wikipedia:WikiProject Hawaii
:Category:WikiProject Hawaii articles
:Category:WikiProject Hawaii participants

Y
 Yellow hibiscus (state flower)
 Yomei Seamount
 Youth Speaks Hawaii
 Yuryaku Seamount
 YWCA Building (Honolulu, Hawaii)

Z
 Zippy's
Zoos in Hawaii
commons:Category:Zoos in Hawaii

Lists
Lists related to the State of Hawaii:
 List of airlines of Hawaii
 List of airports in Hawaii
 List of artists who sculpted Hawaii and its people
 List of beaches in Hawaii
 List of birds of Hawaii
 List of botanical gardens and arboretums in Hawaii
 List of breweries in Hawaii
 List of census statistical areas in Hawaii
 List of cities in Hawaii
 List of colleges and universities in Hawaii
 List of Hawaiian composers
 List of counties in Hawaii
 List of dams and reservoirs in Hawaii
 List of earthquakes in Hawaii
 List of endemic birds of Hawaii
 List of English words of Hawaiian origin
 List of extinct animals of the Hawaiian Islands
 List of figures in the Hawaiian religion
 List of films set in Hawaii
 List of fish of Hawaii
 List of flora of Nihoa
 List of forts in Hawaii
 List of geographical places in Hawaii
 List of ghost towns in Hawaii
 List of governors of Hawaii
 List of Hawaii area codes
 List of Hawaii hurricanes
 List of Hawaii politicians
 List of Hawaii railroads
 List of Hawaiian royal residences
 List of Hawaii state highways
 List of Hawaii state parks
 List of Hawaii state prisons
 List of Hawaii state symbols
 List of Hawaii tornadoes
 List of Hawaiian composers
 List of Hawaiian consorts
 List of Hawaiian dishes
 List of high schools in Hawaii
 List of hospitals in Hawaii
 List of invasive plant species in Hawaii
 List of islands of Hawaii
 List of justices of the Supreme Court of Hawaii
 List of law enforcement agencies in Hawaii
 List of Lepidoptera of Hawaii
 List of lighthouses in Hawaii
 List of Living Treasures of Hawaii
 List of monarchs of Hawaii
 List of mountain passes in Hawaii
 List of mountain peaks of Hawaii
 List of museums in Hawaii
 List of National Historic Landmarks in Hawaii
 List of National Natural Landmarks in Hawaii
 List of newspapers in Hawaii
 List of people from Hawaii
 List of people on the postage stamps of Hawaii
 List of power stations in Hawaii
 List of places in Hawaii
 List of radio stations in Hawaii
 List of Registered Historic Places in Hawaii
 List of restaurants in Hawaii
 List of rivers in Hawaii
 List of school districts in Hawaii
 List of state highways in Hawaii
 List of television stations in Hawaii
 List of tallest buildings in Honolulu
 List of United States Army bases in Hawaii
 List of United States congressional delegations from Hawaii
 List of United States congressional districts in Hawaii
 List of United States representatives from Hawaii
 List of United States senators from Hawaii
 List of volcanoes in the Hawaiian – Emperor seamount chain

See also

Topic overview:
Hawaii
Outline of Hawaii

Hawaii
 
Hawaii